The 1988 San Francisco Giants season was the Giants' 106th season in Major League Baseball, their 31st season in San Francisco since their move from New York following the 1957 season, and their 29th at Candlestick Park. The team finished in fourth place in the National League West with an 83–79 record, 11½ games behind the Los Angeles Dodgers.

Offseason
 December 1, 1987: Brett Butler was signed as a free agent with the Giants.
 December 1, 1987: Joel Youngblood was signed as a free agent by the Giants.
 December 21, 1987: Phil Ouellette was released by the Giants.
 January 8, 1988: Atlee Hammaker was signed as a free agent by the Giants.

Regular season

Opening Day starters
Mike Aldrete
Brett Butler
Will Clark
Dave Dravecky
Candy Maldonado
Francisco Meléndez
Kevin Mitchell
Robby Thompson
José Uribe

Season standings

Record vs. opponents

Notable transactions
 June 1, 1988: Steve Decker was drafted by the Giants in the 21st round of the 1988 Major League Baseball draft. Player signed June 6, 1988.
 June 8, 1988: Jeffrey Leonard was traded by the Giants to the Milwaukee Brewers for Ernest Riles.
 July 15, 1988: Mark Wasinger was released by the Giants.

Roster

Player stats

Batting

Starters by position
Note: Pos = Position; G = Games played; AB = At bats; H = Hits; Avg. = Batting average; HR = Home runs; RBI = Runs batted in

Other batters
Note: G = Games played; AB = At bats; H = Hits; Avg. = Batting average; HR = Home runs; RBI = Runs batted in

Pitching

Starting pitchers 
Note: G = Games pitched; IP = Innings pitched; W = Wins; L = Losses; ERA = Earned run average; SO = Strikeouts

Other pitchers 
Note: G = Games pitched; IP = Innings pitched; W = Wins; L = Losses; ERA = Earned run average; SO = Strikeouts

Relief pitchers 
Note: G = Games pitched; W = Wins; L = Losses; SV = Saves; ERA = Earned run average; SO = Strikeouts

Award winners
 Will Clark, National League Leader, Runs Batted In (109)
 José Uribe SS, Willie Mac Award
All-Star Game

Farm system

References

External links
 1988 San Francisco Giants at Baseball Reference
 1988 San Francisco Giants at Baseball Almanac

San Francisco Giants seasons
San Francisco Giants season
San